NGC 7041B is a spiral or lenticular galaxy in the constellation Indus. The object was discovered on 7 July 1834 by the British astronomer John Herschel.

References 

7041B
Galaxies
Indus (constellation)